Ismail Abdul Razak (born 7 March 1989) is a Ghanaian footballer who plays as a centre midfielder.

Club career

Hapoel Acre

He signed his first professional contract in 2009, and did it with the Israeli club Hapoel Acre, that plays at the Israeli Premier League. He was adapting to the country and to the team, and he became a regular starter. In the first season in Israel played a total of 18 games, all as a starter, scoring a total of 3 goals. The team stayed in the first level of Israeli football and played in the Israeli Premier League again in the 2010–11 season. In this second season at Hapoel Acre, Razak began to decline. He played in 14 out of 33 games that his team played, being 11 times starter. At the end of the season, Abdul Razak left Hapoel Acre and joined Faroe Islands team NSÍ Runavík.

NSÍ Runavík

Ismail Abdul Razak arrived in the Faroe Islands in 2011 to play for NSÍ Runavík in the Faroe Islands Premier League. He played 10 matches, 9 in League and 1 other in Cup, all of them as starter, but this time he did not score any goal. In the summer of 2011, the Spanish Liga Adelante team Real Valladolid asked NSÍ about the availability of the Ghanaian midfielder. In July 2011, he went to Spain to prove himself with Real Valladolid during its pre-season. After some matches, the team's staff as well as his future new manager, Miroslav Đukić, approved him and he joined Real Valladolid.

Real Valladolid

He officially joined with Real Valladolid on 22 August 2011. He signed a 3-years-contract that expires in June 2014. However, after a yearlong association with the Spanish outfit, the Ghanaian decided to rescind his contract.

References

External links
Valladolid official profile 

1989 births
Living people
Footballers from Accra
Ghanaian footballers
Association football midfielders
Hapoel Acre F.C. players
NSÍ Runavík players
Real Valladolid players
Ghanaian expatriate footballers
Expatriate footballers in Israel
Expatriate footballers in the Faroe Islands
Expatriate footballers in Spain